My Dad the Bounty Hunter is an American computer-animated science fiction adventure action-comedy series by Everett Downing Jr. and Patrick Harpin for Netflix. The series premiered on February 9, 2023.

The series received positive reviews for its relatable story, likable characters, social commentary, and portrayal of Black families. The first season was released in its entirety on February 9, 2023.

Premise
The series follows the story of Terry, who is followed by his kids, Lisa and Sean, who learn he is a bounty hunter, and drawn into a space adventure of sorts.

Cast

Main
 Laz Alonso as Terry / Sabo Brok; Father of Lisa and Sean, and secretly conceals his job as a bounty hunter named Sabo Brok from his children and his wife, Tess.
 Priah Ferguson as Lisa; Daughter of Terry and sister of Sean. She is intelligent, sassy, quick witted, and when she sets her mind to anything, she is determined to finish it. Ferguson said that she had no say in the character design, but described Lisa as "so cute" and was impressed animators "even got her edges, the braids, [and] her baby hair".
 JeCobi Swain as Sean; Brother of Lisa and son of Terry. He is nerdy and can become anxious, causing his eye to twitch. According to Downing Jr., Sean's physical condition was inspired by his own daughter's condition.

Recurring

Guest role

Episodes

Season 1 (2023)

Production and release
On October 29, 2020, Netflix announced that My Dad the Bounty Hunter had begun development. At the time of the announcement, Polygon called it a "family-friendly take on The Mandalorian and said the show is "backed by a ton of Black talent".

The series was given an order for a 10-episode first season. The series came together after Downing Jr. and Harpin met at Sony Pictures Animation Studio, with Downing Jr. telling him that he wanted to do a story "with a Black family at the center as a love letter to my family", and they connected on "how real" 1980s sci-fi films were. The series was animated by the French animation studio, Dwarf Animation, Shakira Pressley was a writer for the series, as was Downing Jr. and Harpin. According to Rolling Stone, the series had a majority-Black writers room, which included writer Tomi Adeyemi, and is "a completely original story" rather than a IP. Juston Gordon-Montgomery was the story editor for the series, along with Alex Konstad as art director, and Andrew Chesworth as character design supervisor.

Before the show's premiere, Harpin told Animation Magazine that the show was crafted with the daughter of Downing Jr. behind, but was visually and narratively interesting to young fans, with an aesthetic reminiscent of Alien and The Last Starfighter which he and Downing Jr. liked. In the same interview, Downing Jr. stated that the show's production designer Yuki Demers was instrumental in the show's design, and that he was shown photographs of Black men and women to make sure the character designs were accurate. Harpin and Downing Jr. further argued that show’s "cinematic approach to storytelling" was important, and that they encouraged "intentionally cinematic style" so that the storyboarders and animators could be more creative. Both also noted they discovered "unique opportunities" for the show's team during "quarantine and beyond", and praised interconnectivity of those working on the show.

In another interview with TV Insider, Harpin said they wanted to 2-D but it made more financial sense to do the series 3-D because they "wouldn’t have to build all those sets", but kept flashbacks in 2-D. Downing Jr. noted the importance of casting and that they wanted Priah to voice a character, while Harpin noted the challenges of recording lines because of the COVID-19 pandemic. Harpin and Downing Jr. also emphasized the importance of their show not talking down to kids, but in remaining honest and true, giving characters flaws. When asked about season 2, Downing Jr. said that they would like to "focus on mom" and give her "a shot in the captain’s seat."

A trailer for the series was released on November 16, 2022. A second trailer was posted on January 12, 2023. The series premiered on Netflix on February 9, 2023.

In an interview with the LA Times after the show's premiere, Downing Jr. and Patrick Harpin said that the show's inspiration "is personal", noted the family dynamics in the series and sci-fi influences including The Fifth Element, Star Wars, Outland, and "wild ‘80s stuff for kids". They also noted that the Conglomerate in the show is like the "space colonialism" written about by Frank Herbert. Harpin also told Rolling Stone that films like The Brother from Another Planet, The Incredibles, and Attack the Block were an influence on the series while both show creators said that The Goonies and E.T. were further inspirations. The voice actors Ferguson, Swainn, Orji, and Alonso also supported a possible live-action adaptation of the series.

In March 2023, Kai Akari, a director for the series, told Animation Magazine that many of on the show's crew are "now treasured friends" and was grateful to have relationships with those Akari worked with previously "on other projects".

Reception
The series received generally positive reviews from critics. The review aggregator website Rotten Tomatoes reported a 100% approval rating with an average rating of 7.5/10 based on four critics. The website's critics consensus reads, "When a bounty hunter's two kids accidentally hitch a ride into outer space and crash his latest mission, they discover that their dad's job is anything but boring; dodging aliens and laser fights, this family's bonding time goes to the extreme."

Megan Jordan of Rolling Stone argued that the series is an "Afrofuturist marvel" which tells a futuristic and relatable story that "center[s] Black characters while expanding the audience’s imagination", provides thoughts of what the world could be "in true Black sci-fi fashion", and normalizes "Black heroism for future generations". Kenneth Seward Jr. of IGN described the series as a "delightfully charming, family-friendly space adventure" and an "action-packed romp through space" complete with corny moments, and "a slew of likable characters." He added that the series also hints at "various systemic issues" including forced labor, corrupt corporations, and the line between "willful ignorance and outright compliance". Max Gao of The A.V. Club described the series as an example of the "intergenerational appeal of high-quality animation", including callbacks and nods to "classic sci-fi films", and has a "positive portrayal of a loving Black family...and doesn’t shy away from injecting bits of social commentary".

Karuna Sharma of Meaww described the series as setting the bar for "great animation and an even greater storyline", and praised the series for visualizing each emotion of the characters and called it a "great learning curve for children" who can see the show's world "in all its color and glory". Julie Sprankles of Scarry Mommy said that the series "channels the space adventure vibes from our childhoods", stated that the series is meaningful by "center[ing]...a Black family", and is grounded in "modern family dynamics". Diondra Brown of Common Sense Media described the series as "funny", with a "start-studded and diverse cast", and having some storylines with "mild violence and danger" but doesn't avoid "discussing important topics" and concluded it was an "absolutely fun watch for the whole family".

References

External links
 
 

2020s American animated comedy television series
2020s American black cartoons
2020s American children's television series
2020s American comedy television series
2020s American comic science fiction television series
2023 American television series debuts
American children's animated space adventure television series
American children's animated science fantasy television series
American children's animated comic science fiction television series
American computer-animated television series
English-language Netflix original programming
American children's animated action television series
Fictional mercenaries
Television series by Netflix Animation